Ski mountaineering at the 2020 Winter Youth Olympics took place in Villars-sur-Ollon, Switzerland from 10 to 14 January 2020.

Medal summary

Medal table

Events

Boys' events

Girls' events

Mixed

Qualification

Qualification summary

References

External links
Results Book – Ski mountaineering

 
2020
2020 Winter Youth Olympics events
Youth Olympics